The phoneme inventory of the Marathi language is similar to that of many other Indo-Aryan languages. An IPA chart of all contrastive sounds in Marathi is provided below.

Vowels 
Vowels in native words are:

There is no phonemic length distinction, even though it is indicated in the script. Some educated speakers try to maintain a length distinction in learned borrowings (tatsamas) from Sanskrit.

There are no nasal vowels.

Like other Abugidas, Devanagari writes out syllables by adding vowel diacritics to consonant bases. The table below includes all the vowel symbols used in Marathi, along with a transliteration of each sound into Latin script and IPA.

Marathi retains several features of Sanskrit that have been lost in north-Indian Sanskrit-based languages such as Hindi and Bengali, especially in terms of pronunciation of vowels and consonants. In other Indic languages, it is closer to ). Spoken Marathi allows for conservative stress patterns in words like राम (rama) with an emphasis on the ending vowel sound, a feature that has been lost in Hindi.

Consonants 

 Marathi used to have a /t͡sʰ/ but it merged with /s/.
 Some speakers pronounce /d͡z, d͡zʱ/ as fricatives but the aspiration is maintained in /zʱ/.

A defining feature of the Marathi language is the split of the consonant ल /la/ in Sanskrit words into a retroflex lateral flap ळ and alveolar ल. For instance, कुळ for the Sanskrit कुलम् (kulam 'clan') and कमळ for Sanskrit कमलम् (kamalam 'lotus'). Marathi got ळ possibly due to long contact from Dravidian languages; there are some ḷ words loaned from Kannada like ṭhaḷak from kn. taḷaku but most of the words are native. Vedic Sanskrit did have /ɭ, ɭʱ/ as well, but they merged with /ɖ, ɖʱ/ by the time of classical Sanskrit.

The table below includes all the consonant bases onto which vowel diacritics are placed. The lack of a vowel diacritic can either indicate the lack of a vowel, or the existence of the default, or "inherent", vowel, which in the case of Marathi is the schwa.

Example of consonant–vowel combination 
The combination of the vowels with the k-series

Consonant clusters 
In Marathi, the consonants by default come with a schwa. Therefore, तयाचे will be 'tayāċe', not 'tyāċe'. To form 'tyāċe', one should add त् to याचे, which would yield त्याचे.

References

External links 
 Marathi language sounds

Indo-Aryan phonologies